Robert Murray Pendrigh (September 5, 1897 – January 18, 1978) was a Canadian politician. He served in the Legislative Assembly of New Brunswick as member of the Progressive Conservative party from 1960 to 1963.

References

1897 births
1978 deaths
Physicians from New Brunswick